Atholl is a region of Scotland.

Atholl may also refer to:

Titles 
 Duke of Atholl, in the Peerage of Scotland from 1703
 Earl of Atholl, a Scottish title between 10th - 17th century

People 
 Atholl MacGregor (1883–1945), Scottish lawyer and judge
 Atholl McKinnon (1932–1983), South African cricketer
 Atholl Oakeley (1900–1987), Welsh wrestler and wrestling promoter

Places 
 Atholl, South Africa, a suburb of Johannesburg
 Cape Atholl, Greenland
 Mount Atholl, Antarctica

Other uses 
 Atholl Highlanders, a private infantry regiment
 , of the Royal Canadian Navy

See also 

 
 Atoll (disambiguation)
 Athol (disambiguation)